The 1992 Players Championship was a golf tournament in Florida on the PGA Tour, held March 26–29 at TPC Sawgrass in Ponte Vedra Beach. It was the 19th Players Championship and was won by Davis Love III, four strokes ahead of runners-up  Ian Baker-Finch, Phil Blackmar, Nick Faldo, and Tom Watson.

Playing in his seventh consecutive event on tour, top-ranked Fred Couples carded a course record 63 (−9) in the third round, but followed it up with a 74 and finished eight strokes back. He won the Masters two weeks later. Couples held the previous course record (64), set in the second round of his win in 1984.

Defending champion Steve Elkington missed the 36-hole cut by two strokes.

Venue

This was the eleventh Players Championship held at the TPC at Sawgrass Stadium Course in Ponte Vedra Beach.

Eligibility requirements 
The top 125 PGA Tour members from Final 1991 Official Money List
Designated players
Any foreign player meeting the requirements of a designated player, whether or not he is a PGA Tour member
Winners in the last 10 calendar years of The Players Championship, Masters Tournament, U.S. Open, PGA Championship, and World Series of Golf
British Open winners since 1990
Six players, not otherwise eligible, designated by The Players Championship Committee as "special selections" 
To complete a field of 144 players. those players in order, not otherwise eligible, from the 1992 Official Money List, as of the completion of the Nestle Invitational

Source:

Field
John Adams, Fulton Allem, Billy Andrade, Paul Azinger, Ian Baker-Finch, Seve Ballesteros, Dave Barr, Andy Bean, Chip Beck, Ronnie Black, Phil Blackmar, Jay Don Blake, Bill Britton, Mark Brooks, Billy Ray Brown, Bart Bryant, Brad Bryant, Mark Calcavecchia, David Canipe, Brian Claar, Bobby Clampett, Keith Clearwater, Russ Cochran, John Cook, Fred Couples, Ben Crenshaw, John Daly, Rodger Davis, Jay Delsing, Ed Dougherty, David Edwards, Steve Elkington, Bob Estes, Brad Fabel, Nick Faldo, Brad Faxon, Rick Fehr, Ed Fiori, Bruce Fleisher, Dan Forsman, David Frost, Fred Funk, Jim Gallagher Jr., Robert Gamez, Buddy Gardner, Bob Gilder, Wayne Grady, Hubert Green, Ken Green, Scott Gump, Jay Haas, Gary Hallberg, Dan Halldorson, Jim Hallet, Dudley Hart, Mike Harwood, Nolan Henke, Mike Hulbert, Ed Humenik, John Huston, Hale Irwin, Peter Jacobsen, Lee Janzen, Tom Kite, Kenny Knox, Neal Lancaster, Bernhard Langer, Tom Lehman, Wayne Levi, Bruce Lietzke, Bob Lohr, Davis Love III, Mark Lye, Sandy Lyle, Andrew Magee, Jeff Maggert, John Mahaffey, Roger Maltbie, Billy Mayfair, Blaine McCallister, Mark McCumber, Mark McNulty, Rocco Mediate, Phil Mickelson, Larry Mize, Colin Montgomerie, Gil Morgan, Jodie Mudd, Larry Nelson, Greg Norman, Andy North, Mark O'Meara, José María Olazábal, Craig Parry, Jerry Pate, Steve Pate, Corey Pavin, Calvin Peete, David Peoples, Chris Perry, Kenny Perry, Peter Persons, Dan Pohl, Nick Price, Dillard Pruitt, Tom Purtzer, Mike Reid, Larry Rinker, Loren Roberts, Dave Rummells, Bill Sander, Gene Sauers, Ted Schulz, Tom Sieckmann, Scott Simpson, Tim Simpson, Joey Sindelar, Jeff Sluman, Mike Smith, Mike Springer, Craig Stadler, Payne Stewart, Curtis Strange, Hal Sutton, Lance Ten Broeck, Doug Tewell, Leonard Thompson, David Toms, Kirk Triplett, Chris Tucker, Bob Tway, Howard Twitty, Stan Utley, Bobby Wadkins, Lanny Wadkins, Duffy Waldorf, Tom Watson, D. A. Weibring, Mark Wiebe, Bob Wolcott, Jim Woodward, Ian Woosnam, Robert Wrenn, Fuzzy Zoeller

Round summaries

First round
Thursday, March 26, 1992

Source:

Second round
Friday, March 27, 1992

Source:

Third round
Saturday, March 28, 1992

Source:

Final round
Sunday, March 29, 1992

References

External links
The Players Championship website

1992
1992 in golf
1992 in American sports
1992 in sports in Florida
March 1992 sports events in the United States